California Winter is an American drama film from 2012 written and directed by Odin Ozdil.Had its world premiere at Dances With Films 2013.

Synopsis 
In 2005, Clara Morales begins an upward career in real estate, encouraging risky loans to their customers in order to afford the homes above their means. Loans that she did not fully understand. Also advises the father to take such a loan. With the onset of the housing market slump of 2008, the house of the father of Clara goes to auction, now she tries to save her childhood home which brings you new problems.

Cast

References

External links 
 
 
 California Winter in Rotten Tomatoes

2012 films
American drama films
Films shot in California
Films shot in Los Angeles
Films set in California
Films set in Los Angeles
2012 drama films
2010s English-language films
2010s American films